Harnage is a small village in the English county of Shropshire. It is located just SE of the village of Cound, in whose civil parish it lies, and the nearest notable settlement is Cressage.

Harnage is considered a hamlet, not a village, as it does not have a post office. One road runs through the hamlet, passing residences, Harnage Farm, and Harnage House, a 17th-century house built on the site of an older mansion, allegedly dating back to the 11th or 12th century. The land was owned in the 12th century by Richard de Harnage, the progenitor of the Harnage family in England and in the USA.

The name derives from the old English and means "rocky edge", which describes the area's landscape. It is completely agricultural. At the NW end of the road running through Harnage is the village of Cound (pronounced Koond) and at the other end is a junction at the foot of the hill, that runs into the place called Harnage Grange, a farm consortium, which, in ancient times pre-Henry VIII, used to be the home farm of Buildwas Abbey and Wenlock Priory, a few miles away near the town of Much Wenlock.

See also
Listed buildings in Cound

External links

Villages in Shropshire